Niederwölz is a municipality in the district of Murau in the Austrian state of Styria.

Geography
Niederwölz lies in the upper valley of the Mur.

References

Cities and towns in Murau District